The 2007 Welwyn Hatfield Borough Council election took place on 3 May 2007 to elect members of Welwyn Hatfield Borough Council in Hertfordshire, England. One third of the council was up for election and the Conservative Party stayed in overall control of the council.

After the election, the composition of the council was:
Conservative 35
Labour 10
Liberal Democrat 3

Election result
The results saw the Conservatives increase their majority after gaining 3 seats, which they described as an endorsement of their record in control of the council. They gained 2 seats from Labour in Haldens and Hatfield South wards, while the Liberal Democrats failed to pick up any seats. The third Conservative gain came in Howlands ward, where they defeated Green councillor Jill Weston, who had defected from Labour in 2004. Overall turnout in the election was 33.03%, while dropping as low as 24% in some wards.

Among the Conservative winners in the election were Hannah Berry and Paul Smith, who became the youngest councillors in the council's history at the ages of 18 and 20 respectively, after a recent change in the law had permitted under 21s to stand for election.

One Conservative candidate was unopposed in the election.

Ward results

References

2007
2007 English local elections
2000s in Hertfordshire